Clara-Jumi Kang (born in Mannheim, Germany on 10 June 1987) is a South Korean-German classical violinist. She won the Indianapolis International Violin Competition in 2010 with five additional prizes. Korean newspaper Dong-A Times listed her among Korea's one hundred "most inspiring and influential people" in 2012. She was named the Kumho Musician of the Year in 2013.

Childhood and education 
Kang's parents are famous Korean opera singers: her father is Wagnerian bass Philp Kang, and her mother is soprano Han Min-hee. Clara-Jumi Kang started playing the violin aged three. A year later she became the youngest student ever to enter the Mannheim Musikhochschule, where she studied under Valery Gradov, who had also taught Frank Peter Zimmermann. When Kang was five she moved to Lübeck to study under Professor Zakhar Bron, and performed her first official concerto. German magazine Die Zeit featured six-year-old Kang on its cover, depicting her as a 'Wunderkind'. Aged seven she won a full scholarship to the Juilliard, after the school's violin instructor Dorothy DeLay heard Kang's playing. Kang suffered a serious injury to her hand aged 11 and was not able to play for many years. By 16 Kang had taken her Bachelor and Master's degrees at the Korean National University of Arts under Nam-Yun Kim. While a student in Korea she placed highly in several international violin competitions. She later studied at the Munich Musikhochschule with Christoph Poppen from 2011 to 2013.

Performing and recording career 
Clara-Jumi Kang debuted with the Hamburg Symphony Orchestra aged five. She has placed highly or won many international violin competitions, including the International Violin Competition of Indianapolis.

Kang has performed with orchestras worldwide, including the Cologne Chamber Orchestra, Kremerata Baltica, Rotterdam Philharmonic Orchestra, Orchestre National de Belgique, The Orchestre de la Suisse Romande, New Jersey Symphony Orchestra, Indianapolis Symphony Orchestra, Santa Fe Symphony Orchestra, Mariinsky Theatre Orchestra, NHK Symphony Orchestra, Tokyo Metropolitan Symphony Orchestra, New Japan Philharmonic, Hong Kong Sinfonietta, NCPA Orchestra, Beijing, Macao Orchestra, Taipei Symphony Orchestra, Hamburg Symphony, Kiel Philharmonie, Nice Philharmonie, Atlanta Symphony Orchestra, Seoul Philharmonic Orchestra, KBS Symphony Orchestra, and the Korean Chamber Ensemble. She has worked with conductors including Valery Gergiev, Lionel Bringuier, Vladimir Fedoseyev, Andrey Boreyko, Christoph Poppen, Vladimir Spivakov, Yuri Temirkanov, Gidon Kremer, Gilbert Varga, Lü Jia, Myung-whun Chung, Heinz Holliger and Kazuki Yamada.

Kang recorded Beethoven's Triple Concerto in C Major, Op. 56 for Teldec Classics when she was nine. She released her first solo album, Modern Solo, for Decca in 2011. Her second album, Schumann Brahms Sonatas · Romances, was a chamber duet with classical pianist, Yeol-Eum Son, in 2016. Her Beethoven all Violin Sonatas recording with pianist, Sunwook Kim for Accentus in 2020 received outstanding reviews and nominations.

Awards 
2007: Third Prize, International Tibor Varga Violin Competition
2009: First Prize, Seoul International Music Competition
2009: Second Prize, Joseph Joachim Hannover International Violin Competition
2010: First Prize (and five special prizes), International Violin Competition of Indianapolis
2010: First Prize, Sendai International Music Competition
2012: Daewon Music Award
2014: Kumho Musician of the Year
2015: Fourth Prize, International Tchaikovsky Competition

Discography 
2011: "Modern Solo" (Decca Classics)
2016: "Schumann Brahms Sonatas · Romances" (Decca Classics)

References

External links 
Official website

German classical violinists
South Korean classical violinists
Women classical violinists
Violinists
1987 births
Living people